Durag-e Cheshmeh Konari (also Romanized as Dūrag-e Cheshmeh Konārī; also known as Dorag-e Cheshmeh Konārī) is a village in Rostam-e Yek Rural District, in the Central District of Rostam County, Fars Province, Iran. At the 2006 census, its population was 23, in 6 families.

References 

Populated places in Rostam County